The 2022 ITTF World Youth Championships were held in Tunis, Tunisia, from 4 to 11 December 2022. It was the second edition of the ITTF World Youth Championships, which replaced the World Junior Championships in the ITTF calendar in 2021.

Medal summary

Events

Under-19

Under-15

Medal table

See also
2022 World Team Table Tennis Championships

References

External links
2022 ITTF World Youth Championships
WTT website

World Junior Table Tennis Championships
Youth World Championships
World Youth Table Tennis Championships
Table Tennis
Sports competitions in Tunis
International sports competitions hosted by Tunisia
World Youth Table Tennis Championships